In 1990, present day South Sudan was rocked by a series of violent earthquakes. It started with the largest event, a  7.2, and continued with multiple very large aftershocks for the next couple of months. It contains some of the largest recorded earthquakes anywhere in Africa.

Tectonic setting
The East African Rift System (EARS) is a system of rifts and associated rift lakes within the eastern portion of the African continent. It accommodates the internal breakup of Africa. It is a boundary between the Somali and African Plate. The Victoria and Rovuma microplates help accommodate additional more local stresses. The eastern portion of the rift runs from the Afar rift to Tanzania, while the western portion runs from Lake Albert (Africa) in Uganda all the way down to Mozambique.

The Aswa Rift Zone (ARZ) is an important geologic structure in the area near the earthquakes. The ARZ may act as a broad zone of faulting that links together the eastern and western portions of the EARS. The mainshock occurred along a fault where the ARZ and EARS meet.

Earthquake sequence

May 20 mainshock
The first and largest earthquake in the sequence struck near Juba at 02:22:01 on May 20, 1990. Its focal mechanism shows left-lateral (sinistral) strike-slip faulting, which is consistent with the shear forces in the area of the ARZ. The event killed 31 people and damaged some buildings in Juba, and some in Moyo, Uganda. This event is believed to be the largest earthquake ever recorded in South Sudan, and is one of the largest events known in all of Africa.

May 24 foreshock
At 19:34:44 on May 24, 1990, another large earthquake struck southern South Sudan. The focal mechanism solution varies, with some showing the earthquake being the result of normal dip-slip faulting, while others suggesting it was the result of reverse dip-slip faulting instead.

May 24 mainshock
At 20:00:08, only a little over 25 minutes after the foreshock, an even stronger earthquake struck the region: the second strongest of the whole sequence. The focal mechanisms by various sources again disagree, with some showing normal faulting, with others showing strike slip faulting. It caused additional structural damage to buildings previously affected by the first and strongest shock, however, no casualties occurred. The worst damage was observed in uninhabited areas.

July 9 mainshock
After the sequence had largely finished, another large shock struck the area for a final time. The last big earthquake in the sequence was a  6.0,  6.4-6.5 and  6.6 event. Focal mechanism solutions are split, with a roughly equal proportion of agencies and studies preferring a strike-slip event, with another equal proportion believing it to be a normal faulting event.

Damage
The mainshock killed 31 people and damaged buildings in Juba and Moyo, Uganda. Shaking was felt as far as Nakuru, Kenya. The mainshock of May 24 did further damage. Government buildings and private instutions were damaged in Terekeka, South Sudan. Older buildings in Juba reported cracked walls. Between 8,000 and 10,000 of the displaced required extra relief and shelter. 300,000 people were made homeless across the region as a result of the earthquakes.

See also
 List of earthquakes in 1990
 2006 Mozambique earthquake

References

Sources

External links
 M 7.2 - 69 km ENE of Juba, South Sudan – United States Geological Survey
 M 6.5 - 54 km NNE of Juba, South Sudan – United States Geological Survey
 M 7.1 - 63 km NNE of Juba, South Sudan – United States Geological Survey
 M 6.6 - 60 km N of Juba, South Sudan – United States Geological Survey
 
 
 
 

South Sudan earthquakes
South Sudan earthquakes
South Sudan earthquakes
South Sudan earthquakes
Earthquakes in Africa
South Sudan earthquakes